Captain Abercromby is a children's TV show that was on BBC Two in 2002–2003. Its cast are puppets.

Series overview

Captain Abercromby was a puppet series about a boy named Abercromby, who is raised by his grandfather. After hearing the tale of how his Grandpa lost his watch, which was given to him by Abercromby's mother, he dreams that he is a captain of a seaship, the "Hope", and that he is on a mission to find the watch. They have a rival crew attempting to find buried treasure, run by Captain Jake in his ship "Thunderbottom", who mistakenly (but logically) believe that Abercromby is looking for buried treasure, so making the series a race between the two ships.

Each show would open with Abercromby's Grandpa telling his story, in a green wooden bedroom surrounded by characters and props which later fill out the cast of Abercromby's dreams – a suit of armour in the corner (Arthur), a carved mermaid (Siren) and the tree outside (Great Oak). The following shots showed Abercromby climbing into bed (with Pointdexter on the end) and going to sleep, saying "I'll find that watch one day", entering the dream world of the show and starting the title sequence.

Each story would finish with an alarm clock ringing, bringing Abercromby out of his dream and waking up to his Grandpa standing by his bed. Abercromby then begins to tell his Grandpa an excited summary of the episode, volume fading down as the credits and music roll over the scene.

Characters

Abercromby's crew
 Abercromby – the show's titular character, Abercromby is a boy who dreams of an adventure where he is trying to find his Grandpa's missing watch.
 Siren – Abercromby's shipmate, and the living figurehead of the ship. She believes in Abercromby the most, and is the one who will convince the others to save him.
 Great Oak – a talking tree, an Oak Tree in particular, he is the ship's helmsman, and responsible for keeping the ship moving. He is also the fount of knowledge and wisdom on board the ship.
 Arthur – a talking suit of armour that works on the ship. Arthur is a bumbling character, and is the prominent character in the series, next to Abercromby himself.
 Poindexter – the ship's janitor, who is also a purple talking dog. Poindexter is quite intelligent, as he is shown doing things humans are subject to do. Aside from Captain Abercromby, he is the only character to cross from the "real" world into the "dream" world.

Thunderbottom Crew
 Captain Jake – a pirate, and arch rival to Abercromby. Although Jake is a fully grown man, he often resorts to very childish behaviour. Jake looks like a very typical pirate, but much of his appearance is put on – his eyepatch just covers a perfectly good eye, and his hook is held in one of his hands. Jake's schemes to catch up with Abercromby usually involve a comedic comeupance.
 Bobweb – a spider, she sits on Jake's shoulder much as a parrot would on a stereotypical pirate. She is the scheming half of the partnership, more intelligent than Jake, but just as likely to get her just deserts.
 Russian Dolls – the Thunderbottom is also home to three black and white "pirate-themed" Russian dolls, varying in size from one bigger than all the other characters on board to a small "Baby skull" doll.
 Seagulls – most of the crew of Thunderbottom is Seagulls who often speak or are randomly assigned a name.
 Clawdia – ship's cat, and most often behind the wheel of the Thunderbottom.
 Snappy – the chef. A red lobster, he was voiced in a pastiche of Woody Allen's mannersisms.

Other characters
 Sultan – the ruler of "Rabadabdab", a seaside exotic port which was the most frequent mooring for the "Hope". Like most of "Rabadabdab"'s inhabitants, he was a bird, a purple puffin.
 Lily Limpet – East-end mollusc who serves food and drink at the Limpet Inn, Rabadabdab's drinking hole (soft drinks only!)
 Admiral Dobbin – authority figure, head of the "King's Navy". Admiral Dobbin would often enter the story to sort out a mess.
 Grandpa – Abercromby's grandfather and guardian whose watch Abercromby dreams of finding.

Episode titles
 Birthday Bash
 Sailor of the Year
 Captain's Cook
 The Duel
 Extra Pair of Paws
 Unlucky For Some
 The Right Treatment
 The Rule Book
 The Sultan's Visit
 Mrs Jake
 Arthur's Family Tree
 Trumpet Boy
 Out of the Hat
 Watch Out
 Navy Blues
 Lights Out
 Stowaway Star
 What A Washout
 Gee A Genie
 The Sultan's Challenge
 Big Blue Fish
 Mummy's Little Treasure
 Bobweb's Machine
 Bully For You
 Captain Invisible
 Marooned

In one episode of the series, "Out of the Hat", Abercromby and his crew briefly find his Grandpa's watch, seen every week in the opening title sequence. However, this copy of the watch is dismissed by Admiral Dobbin as being a fake.

Production

The show was produced by Wark Clements for BBC Scotland. Filming took place from February to July 2001 in Glasgow. The series was being filmed at the Media Park in Maryhill, Glasgow but on 22 April a fire took hold of the studio, destroying all sets, props and equipment. The production relocated to another nearby studio to complete the filming, after rebuilding as much as they needed to finish filming.  The music for the show was composed by Rowland Lee.

Style

The puppets and design of the show were all created in a child-friendly cartoon style, with the majority of the creatures being Muppet-type puppets (although they were built by Neil Sterenberg's studio, not Jim Henson's).

Crew

References

External links
 http://www.toonhound.com/abercromby.htm

BBC children's television shows
2000s British children's television series
British television shows featuring puppetry
2002 British television series debuts
2003 British television series endings